This article lists political parties in Galicia, Spain.

Parties represented in the Galician Parliament

Parties without representation

Smaller parties  
 Galicianist Tide (En Marea–CxG–PG) 
Zero Cuts–Common Space–The Greens–Municipalists (RC–EsCo–OV–M)
Equo Galicia (Equo) 
Communist Party of the Workers of Galicia (PCTG) 
For a Fairer World (PUM+J)  
Blank Seats (EB)  
Libertarian Party (P–LIB)  
XXI Convergence (C21)

List of political parties in Galicia 
 Alternativa Española (AES)
 Falange Española de las J.O.N.S. (FE de las JONS)
 Falange Auténtica (FA)
 Democracia Nacional (DN)
 Partido Obrero Socialista Internacionalista (POSI)
 Partido Animalista Contra el Maltrato Animal (PACMA)
 Os Verdes-Grupo Verde
 Partido dos Socialistas de Galicia-Spanish Socialist Workers' Party
 Bloque Nacionalista Galego (BNG)
 Solidaridad y Autogestión Internacionalista (SAIn)
 Esquerda Unida (EU)
 Asamblea De Votación Electronica (AVE)
 Partido Popular de Galicia (PP)
 Comunión Tradicionalista Carlista (CTC)
 Partido Humanista de Galicia (PH)Unión do Povo Galego
 Ciudadanos – Partido de la Ciudadanía (C's)
 Por Un Mundo Más Justo (PUM+J)
 Identidade Galega (IDEGA)
 Unión Progreso y Democracia (UPyD)
 Partido Familia y Vida (PFyV)
 Terra Galega (TG)
 Partido da Terra (PT)
 Frente Popular Galega (FPG)
 Nós-Unidade Popular (NOS-UP)
 Unión do Povo Galego (UPG)
 Assambleia da mocidade independentista (AMI)
 Partido Galeguista (PG)
 Converxencia nacionalista galega
 Esquerda de Galicia (EG)
 Alternativa dos veciños
 Converxencia XXI (CXXI)

Candidates for the 2008 elections.
 Alternativa Española (AES): José María Permuy Rey
 Falange Española de las J.O.N.S. (FE de las JONS): María Teresa Jiménez Campo
 Falange Auténtica (F.A.): Raul Alfonso Sánchez
 Democracia Nacional (D.N.): Ramses Araujo Oyonarte
 Partido Obrero Socialista Internacionalista (POSI): Francisco Cuso Torello
 Partido Antitaurino Contra El Maltrato Animal (PACMA): María Pilar Sánchez Rodriguez
 Los Verdes De Europa (LVE): Alfredo García Ojeda
 Movimiento Católico Español (MCE): Movimiento Católico Español
 Spanish Socialist Workers' Party (PSOE): Francisco Javier Losada De Azpiazu, José Antonio Nóvoa Romay and María Sandra Rios Buoza
 Bloque Nacionalista Galego (BNG): Xosé Bieito González Domínguez, Avia González Veira, Ana María Vérez Gómez
 Alternativa Independiente De Galicia (AIDG): María Sol Garcia Barbeito and José Garcia Fernández
 Solidaridad y Autogestión Internacionalista (SAIn): Yolanda María Gómez Gómez, María Prieto Vidal and Oscar Quintela Jorge
 Esquerda Unida Alternativa (IU): Jesús Díaz Díaz, Marta marroquín Travieso and Manuel Veiga Vilariño
 Asamblea De Votación Electronica (AVE): Jorge Juan Fernández Barriero
 People's Party (PP): Juan Manuel Junical Rodríguez, María Jesús Amparo Sainz Garcia and José Luís Ramón Torres Colomer
 Comunión Tradicionalista Carlista (CTC): Victor Puigdengolas Sustaeta
 Partido Humanista (PH): Manuel Bello Souto, María Luisa Fernández Rodríguez and Juan Carlos Reguera Pena
 Ciudadanos – Partido de la Ciudadanía (C's): José Manuel Gómez Franco
 Por Un Mundo Más Justo (PUM+J): Ignacio Pita Olalla
 Partido Social Demócrata (PSD): Elisabeth Verdejo Millán
 Identidad Gallega (IDEGA): José Pérez Rodríguez
 Unión Progreso y Democracia (UPyD): Don José Luis Castro Núñez, Doña María De Los Ángeles Colmenero Ruiz and Rudy Lamas Gesto
 Partido Familia y Vida (PFyV): Montserrat Colell Malla

References 

Lists of political parties in Spain